Mason Novick (born December 20, 1974) is an American film producer and talent manager based in Los Angeles.

Background

Career
His credits include Red Eye (2005), Juno (2007), (500) Days of Summer (2009) and Jennifer's Body (2009). He has also acted in small roles in his films, including parts in Red Eye and The Hollow.

His in development projects include the Diablo Cody adaption of Sweet Valley High for the big screen.

Professional relationship with Diablo Cody
Novick has taken part in several projects with screenwriter Diablo Cody, including Jennifer's Body, and Juno, for which he was nominated for the Academy Award for Best Picture in 2008, and won a Christopher Award and an Independent Spirit Award.

Novick claims to have found Diablo Cody by reading Cody's blog while she was a blogger living in Minneapolis. He found "her voice [to be] so interesting and so fresh".  Inspired by her writing, he rang Cody and asked her whether she had ever considered writing a book or a screenplay.  As a result of Novick's encouragement, Cody wrote the script which would become Juno.

Novick has worked with Cody on Young Adult (2011), Paradise (2013), and Tully, as well as an unmade cinematic adaptation of Sweet Valley High.

Partial filmography
He was a producer in all films unless otherwise noted.

Film

As an actor

Thanks

Television

As an actor

Recognition
In 2008, Novick won both a Christopher Award and an Independent Spirit Award for Best Film for Juno. He was nominated for the Producers Guild of America and Academy Award for Best Picture also for Juno.

Awards & nominations
2010, Nominated for Independent Spirit Award
2008, Won, Independent Spirit Award
2008, Won, Christopher Award
2007, Nominated for Academy Award for Best Motion Picture
2007, Nominated for PGA Awards for Motion Picture Producer of the Year Award

References

External links

American film producers
1974 births
Living people